George C. Lee (born November 23, 1936) is a retired American basketball player and coach. A  forward/guard from the University of Michigan, Lee was selected by the Detroit Pistons in the fourth round of the 1959 NBA draft.  He had a seven-year career in the NBA, playing two seasons with the Pistons and five with the San Francisco Warriors.

He retired from playing in 1968, and coached the Warriors for the next two seasons, before being replaced by Al Attles in 1970.

See also
 University of Michigan Athletic Hall of Honor

External links
 BasketballReference.com: George Lee (as player)
 BasketballReference.com: George Lee (as coach)

1936 births
Living people
American men's basketball coaches
American men's basketball players
Basketball coaches from Michigan
Basketball players from Michigan
Detroit Pistons draft picks
Detroit Pistons players
Michigan Wolverines men's basketball players
People from Highland Park, Michigan
San Francisco Warriors head coaches
San Francisco Warriors players
Shooting guards
Small forwards